The Coral Sea is a live recording of two performances by Patti Smith and Kevin Shields from 2005 and 2006. The set consists of Smith's homage to the photographer, her friend and former lover Robert Mapplethorpe, and consists of the text of her epic 1996 poem of the same title. Shields accompanies in an improvisational manner on guitar.

Recording
The performances were recorded on June 22, 2005 and September 12, 2006 (with a third, unreleased performance the previous night) at Queen Elizabeth Hall on London's South Bank. In terms of music the two performances are stylistically different, but the words remain the same. The poem tells the story of M (Mapplethorpe) on a final voyage to see the stars of the Southern Cross before he dies.

Track listing

Personnel
All personnel credits adapted from The Coral Seas liner notes.

Performers
Patti Smith – vocals
Kevin Shields – guitar, mixing

Technical personnel
Ben Thackeray – engineer
Emery Dobyns – engineer

Design personnel
Xiaofei Zhang – art direction, design

Release history

References

External links

2008 albums
2008 live albums
Patti Smith albums
Vocal–instrumental duet albums
Albums produced by Kevin Shields
Self-released albums